Ann Dearing Holtgren Pellegreno (born 1937 in Chicago, Illinois) is a professional musician, teacher, author, lecturer, and farmer. In 1967, Pellegreno and a crew of three successfully flew a similar aircraft (a Lockheed 10A Electra) to complete a world flight that closely mirrored Amelia Earhart's flight plan in 1937. On the 30th anniversary of Earhart's disappearance, Pellegreno dropped a wreath in her honor over tiny Howland Island and returned to Oakland, California, completing the 28,000-mile (45,000 km) commemorative flight on July 7, 1967.

Early years
In 1960, on the day she obtained her private pilot's license, Pellegreno took her mother up for a surprise flight as her first passenger; Mrs. Holtgren was not aware that her daughter had learned to fly. Within five years, Pellegreno obtained a commercial pilot's license, to which she added ratings for instrument, multi-engine, and flight instructor for airplanes and instruments.

1967 flight

Ann Pellegreno's decision to retrace Earhart's round-the-world flight route in a Lockheed Electra can be traced to the encouragement of her airplane mechanic, Lee Koepke, in 1962. Koepke owned a twin-engine Lockheed Electra 10A that he was restoring at the time, a sistership to that flown by Amelia Earhart on her fateful world flight in 1937. The first article of the historic commemorative event appeared in a Detroit newspaper on March 6, 1967. In April and May of that year the Electra was retrofitted with final fuel equipment for the flight at Javelin Aircraft in Wichita, Kansas. On June 9, she and her crew of three took off from Oakland, California in the plane. Her crew was made up of William L. Polhemus (navigator), William "Bill" R. Payne (co-pilot) and Lee Koepke (owner and restorer of the Electra). The Electra was originally registered in Canada as CF-TCA and re-registered in the U.S. as N79237 when Pellegreno and her crew made their round-the-world flight.

Pellegreno proceeded from Willow Run, Detroit, Michigan on June 7, 1967 to Oakland, to take off from the same airport from which Earhart departed 30 years before. It was wheels-up on this commemorative round-the-world flight on June 9 when she took off from Oakland flying east on their journey. Pellegreno and her team followed the same route Earhart and navigator Fred Noonan followed in 1937, but for better re-fueling connections landed at differing airports. They carried 2,000 sets of philatelic covers that would be canceled at various cities on their path, to be sold to collectors to help finance their flight. Unlike the 1937 flight, Pellegreno's Electra was equipped with state-of-the-art radio and navigation equipment.

After a refueling stop at Nauru in the Pacific, Pellegreno flew to Howland Island, making a tribute fly-over at approximately the same time and on the same day as Earhart and Noonan would have arrived there 30 years before on July 2, 1937. On that day, July 2, 1967, Pellegreno personally dropped a wreath commemorating the history-making round-the-world effort of Earhart and Noonan. Exactly 30 years later, Pellegreno found Earhart's flight-planned destination – tiny Howland Island – dropped a wreath, and returned to Oakland on July 7.

She arrived back at Oakland having completed the 28,000-mile commemorative flight. She then returned the Electra to Willow Run arriving there on July 10. On July 15, the Michigan Legislature declared it "Ann Pellegreno Day" and had a parade in her home town of Saline, Michigan.

Itinerary
Departed Willow Run, Detroit, MI (Pre-Flight), June 7, 1967
 South Bend, IN
 Cedar Rapids, IA
 Ogden, UT
Departed Oakland, CA (Start round-the-world), June 9, 1967
 Tucson, AZ
 Fort Worth, TX
 New Orleans, LA
 Miami, FL
 San Juan, Puerto Rico
 Caracas, Venezuela
 Trinidad
 Paramaribo, Suriname
 Belem, Brazil
 Natal, Brazil (Atlantic Ocean crossing) June 15, 1967
 Dakar, Senegal, June 17, 1967
 Las Palmas, Canary Islands
 Lisbon, Portugal
 Rome, Italy
 Ankara, Turkey
 Tehran, Iran
 Karachi, Pakistan, June 22, 1967
 New Delhi, India
 Calcutta, India
 Bangkok, Thailand
 Singapore, June 27, 1967
 Djakarta, Indonesia
 Kupang, Timor
 Darwin, Australia
 Port Moresby, New Guinea
 Lae, New Guinea (Pacific Ocean crossing), June 30, 1967
 Nauru Island
 Howland Island (Fly-over), July 2, 1967
 Canton Island
 Honolulu, HI
Arrived Oakland, CA (Finish round-the-world), July 7, 1967
 Denver, CO (Post-flight)
 Newton, KS
 Oshkosh, WI
Arrived Willow Run, Detroit, MI, October 7, 1967

Later years
In 1974 Pellegreno was appointed to the Aeronautics Commission, the first woman thus serving in Iowa, and also to the Iowa Department of Transportation Commission, the first woman in the nation to serve in that capacity. Pellegreno was inducted into the International Forest of Friendship of The Ninety-Nines, Inc. (1987), the Iowa Aviation Hall of Fame (1990), the Michigan Aviation Hall of Fame (1991), and the Experimental Aircraft Association – Vintage Aircraft Association Hall of Fame (1997). Her first book, World Flight, the Earhart Trail, was published in 1971. The first two volumes of her trilogy Iowa Takes to the Air were published in 1980 and 1986. Pellegreno was inducted into the Iowa Women's Hall of Fame in 2001.

The Lockheed Electra owned by Lee Koepke was, in a previous existence, one of the three Trans-Canada Airlines Electras that were used to initiate transcontinental air service in Canada in 1937. After Pellegreno's flight, the Canada Aviation Museum acquired the aircraft from Koepke. Volunteers from Air Canada (the new name of Trans-Canada Airlines) overhauled the aircraft in 1968 and donated it to the museum. Today, Lockheed Electra (S/N 1112) is part of the National Aeronautical Collection and is displayed in its original CF-TCA configuration.

Dedications
Dedication of her World Flight at the beginning of her book:

Dedication of her World Flight at the end of her book:

See also
Pratt & Whitney
Lockheed
Linda Finch

References
Notes

Bibliography

 Briand, Paul, Jr. Daughter of the Sky. New York: Duell, Sloan and Pearce, 1960.
 Burke, John. Winged Legend: The Story of Amelia Earhart. New York: Ballantine Books, 1971. .
 Crouch, Thomas D. "Searching for Amelia Earhart." Invention & Technology Volume 23, Issue 1, Summer 2007.
 Davidson, J.B. Amelia Earhart Returns from Saipan. Canton, Ohio: Davidson, 1969.
 Duffy, Paul. Amelia Earhart, World Flight 1937, World Flight 1997, Linda Finch (booklet). East Hartford, CT: Pratt & Whitney Aircraft Group, 1997. 
 Dwiggens, Don. Hollywood Pilot: The Biography of Paul Mantz. Garden City, New York: Doubleday & Company, Inc., 1967.
 Earhart, Amelia. "The Fun of It." New York: Harcourt, Brace, 1932.
 Gillespie, Ric. Finding Amelia: The True Story of the Earhart Disappearance. Annapolis, Maryland: Naval Institute Press, 2006. .
 Goerner, Fred. The Search for Amelia Earhart. New York: Doubleday, 1966. .
 Hoffman, David. Following Amelia Earhart: Heroines of the Sky (DVD). Camden, ME: Varied Directions International, 2002.
 Molson, Kenneth M. et al. Canada's National Aviation Museum: Its History and Collections. Ottawa: National Aviation Museum, 1988. .
 Morrissey, Muriel. Courage Is the Price. Wichita: McCormick-Armstrong Publishing Division, 1963. .
 Pellegreno, Ann H. World Flight, The Earhart Trail. Ames, Iowa: Iowa State University Press, 1971, .
 Ryan, John. The Hot Land: Focus on New Guinea. New York: St. Martin's Press, 1969.
 Safford, Laurance F. with Cameron A. Warren and Robert R. Payne. Earhart's Flight into Yesterday: The Facts Without the Fiction. McLean, Virginia: Paladwr Press, 2003. .
 Szabo, Corinne. Sky Pioneer: A Photobiography of Amelia Earhart. Washington, DC: National Geographic Children's Books, 1997. .
 Van Pelt, Lori. Amelia Earhart: The Sky's No Limit (American Heroes). New York: Macmillan, 2005. .

External links
World Flight

1937 births
Living people
Aviators from Illinois
Musicians from Chicago
University of Michigan School of Music, Theatre & Dance alumni
American women aviators
People from Saline, Michigan
Amelia Earhart